Physical Review Letters (PRL), established in 1958, is a peer-reviewed, scientific journal that is published 52 times per year by the American Physical Society. As also confirmed by various measurement standards, which include the Journal Citation Reports impact factor and the journal h-index proposed by Google Scholar, many physicists and other scientists consider Physical Review Letters to be one of the most prestigious journals in the field of physics.

PRL is published as a print journal, and is in electronic format, online and CD-ROM. Its focus is rapid dissemination of significant, or notable, results of fundamental research on all topics related to all fields of physics. This is accomplished by rapid publication of short reports, called "Letters".  Papers are published and available electronically one article at a time. When published in such a manner, the paper is available to be cited by other work. The Lead Editor is Hugues Chaté. The Managing Editor is Robert Garisto.

Scope and organizational format
Physical Review Letters is an internationally read physics journal with a diverse readership. Advances in physics, as well as cross disciplinary developments, are disseminated weekly, via this publication. Topics covered by this journal are also the explicit titles for each section of the journal. Sections are delineated (in the table of contents) as follows:

General Physics: Statistical and Quantum mechanics, Quantum information, etc.
Gravitation and astrophysics
Elementary particles and fields
Nuclear physics
Atomic, molecular, and optical physics
Nonlinear dynamics, Fluid dynamics, Classical optics, etc.
Plasma and beam physics
Condensed matter: Structure, etc.
Condensed Matter: Semiconductor-Electronic properties, etc.
Polymer, Soft matter, Biological, and Interdisciplinary physics

Worthy of note is a section at the front of the table of contents which consists of articles that are highlighted for their particular importance and interest. This section contains articles suggested by the editors of the journal or which have been covered by the site "Physics" (formerly Physical Review Focus).

Historical overview
On May 20, 1899, 36 physicists gathered to establish the American Physical Society at Columbia University, in the City of New York. These 36 decided that the mission of the APS would be "to advance and diffuse the knowledge of physics". In the beginning the dissemination of physics knowledge took place only through quarterly scientific meetings. In 1913, the APS took over the operation of Physical Review, already in existence since 1893. Hence, journal publication also became an important goal, second only to its original mission. During the late 1950s, the then editor Sam Goudsmit collected, organized and published Letters to the Editor of Physical Review into a new standalone journal. This established the Physical Review Letters, Volume 1, Issue 1 was published on July 1, 1958 (see archives link). As the years passed the research fields in physics multiplied, and so did the number of submissions. Consequently, Physical Review was divided into five separate sections after December 1969 into Physical Review A, B, C, D and E, which are distinct from Physical Review Letters.

Abstracting, indexing, and impact factor
Physical Review Letters is indexed in the following bibliographic databases:

Chemical Abstracts
Computer & Control Abstracts
Current Physics Index
Electrical & Electronics Index
Energy Research Abstracts
GeoRef
INSPEC
International Aerospace Abstracts
Mathematical Reviews
Medline
Metals Abstracts
Nuclear Science Abstracts
Physics Abstracts
PubSCIENCE
SPIN
World Aluminum Abstracts

See also
First observation of gravitational waves
1964 PRL symmetry breaking papers
American Journal of Physics
Annales Henri Poincaré
CRC Handbook of Chemistry and Physics

References

External links
 
 All Volumes and Issues
 Collections of articles
 50th Anniversary Milestone Papers
 "Physics"

Physics journals
Publications established in 1958
Weekly journals
English-language journals
American Physical Society academic journals